Paul Rester is the director of the Joint Intelligence Group
at the United States' Guantanamo Bay detention camps, in Cuba—the Chief Interrogator.

Rester described the interrogation techniques the military used at Guantanamo to the Associated Press.
He said he was concerned that the CIA's use of "extended interrogation techniques" had given the public the wrong impression of the techniques the military used at Guantanamo.

Rester told Andrew Selsky of the Associated Press that the successes of the American military interrogators had come through "rapport-building" techniques—not coercive or brutal techniques.  
He said Joint Task Force Guantanamo commander Mark Buzby had authorized him to describe one of the interrogators recent successes.

Rester acknowledged that Mohammed al Qahtani, and one other captive, had been subjected to rougher treatment in 2002.
He didn't offer the name of the other captive who had been subjected to rougher treatment.

Time Magazine reported that Mohammed al Qahtani's interrogation log had been leaked to them, and that it documented he had been subjected to almost two months of sleep deprivation, forced nudity, force-feedings, forced enemas, threats against his family, and sexual humiliation.

According to Selsky's article Joshua Colangelo-Bryan, a lawyer who volunteered to help Guantanamo captives "scoffed at Rester's contention that rough treatment at Guantanamo was restricted to just two men."

Following the United States Supreme Court's ruling in Hamdan v. Rumsfeld Rester stated:

References

Year of birth missing (living people)
Living people
Guantanamo Bay detention camp